The Endeavor Award is an award celebrating the contributions on the public benefit of flying.

The award was established in 2014 by producer and pilot Mark Wolper. The presenter's at the California Science Center for 2015 are Ben Affleck and Scott Terry.

2014
Veterans Airlift Command
Wings Flights of Hope
Patient Airlift Services
2015
Clay Lacy
Ben Affleck, Scott Terry - Global Flight Relief

See also

 List of aviation awards

References

Aviation awards